The Mobolaji Johnson Arena is a multi-purpose stadium in Lagos.  It is currently used for football matches and it is the home stadium of various Lagos teams, most notably Ikorodu United F.C., Stationery Stores F.C., First Bank and Julius Berger FC.  The stadium has a capacity of 10,000 people and is the oldest in Nigeria. Located on the southeastern corner of Lagos Island near Tafewa Balewa Square, the original stadium was built in 1930 and six years later named after King George V. Between 1963 and 1973, it became known as the Lagos City Stadium. The current Onikan Stadium was renovated and reopened for football and cultural activities in the 1980s.
In March 2008, the stadium was banned for use the rest of the season by the Nigeria Football League when a pitch invasion injured many members of the Warri Wolves after a scoreless draw with First Bank.

In 2019, it was renamed by the Lagos state government, from Onikan stadium to Mobolaji Olufunso Johnson Stadium.

References

External links
 
 NFL shuts down Onikan Stadium
 http://www.city-data.com/world-cities/Lagos-Sports.html
 www.guardiannewsngr.com/sports/article10/090207
 Blog with game notes,pictures

Football venues in Nigeria
Sport in Lagos
Multi-purpose stadiums in Nigeria
Sports venues in Lagos
Lagos Island
Sports venues completed in 1930
1930 establishments in Nigeria
Lagos
20th-century architecture in Nigeria